Valmouth is a 1958 musical by Sandy Wilson based on the novel of the same name by Ronald Firbank.

It premiered in London at the Lyric Hammersmith, before transferring to the Saville Theatre.

The production was directed by Vida Hope. It made a star of Fenella Fielding as Lady Parvula de Panzoust.

The musical has since been staged several times including twice at the Chichester Festival Theatre and several cast album recordings have been released. The musical has also been performed on BBC radio, first broadcast in 1975.

Original cast
Captain Dick Thoroughfare - Alan L Edwards
Cardinal Pirelli - Geoffrey Dunn
Carry - Denise Hirst
David Tooke -	Peter Gilmore
Dr Dee	- Lewis Henry
Father Colley-Mahoney	- Robert Bernal
Granny Tooke -	Doris Hare
Lady Parvula de Panzoust - Fenella Fielding
Lady Saunter - Celia Helda
Lt. Jack Whorwood - Aubrey Woods
Madame Mimosa - Marcia Owen
Mrs Hurstpierpoint - Barbara Couper
Mrs Q. Comedy	- Sally Alsford
Mrs Thoroughfare - Betty Hardy
Mrs Yajnavalkya - Bertice Reading (played by Cleo Laine at Saville Theatre)
Niri-Esther - Maxine Daniels
Sir Victor Vatt - Roderick Jones
Thetis Tooke - Patsy Rowlands

Songs
Opening / Valmouth - Company
Magic Fingers - Mrs Vajnanalkaya
Mustapha - Mrs Vajnanalkaya
I Loved a Man - Thetis Tooke
What Then Can Make Him Come So Low? - Niri-Esther
All the Girls Were Pretty - Mrs Hurstpierpoint, Lady Parvula, Mrs Thoroughfare
Just Once More - Lady Parvula
Lady of the Manor - Niri-Esther
What Do I Want With Love - David Tooke
My Big Best Shoes - Mrs Vajnanalkaya, Grannie Tooke
Niri-Esther - Jack Whorwood, Captain Dick
The Cry of the Peacock - Mrs Vajnanalkaya
Little Baby Girl - Mrs Vajnanalkaya
The Cathedral of Clemenza - Cardianl Pirelli
Only a Passing Phase - Lady Parvula
Valmouth - Captain Dick
Where the Trees Are Green With Parrots - Niri-Esther
My Talking Day - Sister Ecclesia
I Will Miss You - Grannie Tooke, Mrs Vajnanalkaya
Finale / Valmouth - Company

Critical reception
Plays and Players wrote "Sandy Wilson's lyrics include, by my reckoning, at least half a dozen potential hits beside 'Big Best Shoes'. Valmouth, in short, bewitches by its riches as the opening chorus swore it would."

References

1958 musicals
British musicals
Musicals based on novels
West End musicals